Mon Bhattrai is a Bhutanese international footballer. He made his first appearance for the Bhutan national football team in 2011.

References

Bhutanese footballers
Living people
Association football goalkeepers
Year of birth missing (living people)
Bhutan international footballers
Bhutanese people of Nepalese descent